Pierre Karlów was a Polish naturalized Iranian football goalkeeper. Karlów was one of Polish immigrants to Iran due to World War II. He is the very first foreigner to play for Esteghlal. He played for Iran national football team against Turkey.

References 
 Goal.com
 Goal sports newspaper
 Esteghlal

Association football goalkeepers
Esteghlal F.C. players
Polish expatriate footballers
Naturalized citizens of Iran
Polish footballers
Iranian footballers
Iran international footballers
Polish emigrants to Iran
Possibly living people
Year of birth missing
Place of birth missing